Mount Carrigain is a mountain located in Grafton County, New Hampshire. The mountain is named after Phillip Carrigain, NH Secretary of State (1805–10), and is on the south side of the Pemigewasset Wilderness, the source of the East Branch of the Pemigewasset River in the heart of the White Mountains, between Franconia Notch and Crawford Notch.  Carrigain is flanked to the northeast beyond Carrigain's Vose Spur by Mount Anderson and Mount Lowell across Carrigain Notch, and to the southwest by Mount Hancock.  It has a fire tower at the summit, providing 360 degree views of the surrounding wilderness.

Geography
The south side of Mount Carrigain drains into the Sawyer River, thence into the Saco River, which drains into the Gulf of Maine at Saco, Maine.
The east side of Mt. Carrigain drains into Carrigain Brook, thence into the Sawyer River. The north side of Carrigain drains into the East Branch of the Pemigewasset River, a tributary of the Merrimack River, which drains into the Gulf of Maine at Newburyport, Massachusetts. The west side of Carrigain drains into the Carrigain Branch of the East Branch of the Pemigewasset.

Vose Spur

Vose Spur is a subpeak of Mount Carrigain, named after George L. Vose.  The summit is densely wooded.  It is officially trailless and counts as one of New England's one hundred highest summits.  Several different approaches are possible. A talus field on the eastern slope, can be reached by bushwhacking from the Carrigain Notch Trail and offers outstanding views into Carrigain Notch and over to Mount Lowell.

See also

 List of mountains in New Hampshire
 White Mountain National Forest
 four-thousand footers
 New England Hundred Highest
 New England Fifty Finest

References

External links
 "Mount Carrigain". Appalachian Mountain Club.
 
 "Mount Carrigain". HikeTheWhites.com.
 
 
 "Mt. Carrigain and Vose Spur Loop with Bushwhack". Hike-NewEngland.com

Mountains of New Hampshire
Mountains of Grafton County, New Hampshire
New England Four-thousand footers